was a Japanese idol girl group formed in 2012. They participated in the 2015 Tokyo Idol Festival. Their single "Let’s Go!!" reached the 15th place on the Weekly Oricon Singles Chart.

They disbanded after their final tour on February 24, 2020.

Discography

Albums

Singles

DVDs

Notes

References

External links
 

Japanese idol groups
Japanese girl groups
Musical groups established in 2012
Musical groups disestablished in 2020
2012 establishments in Japan
2020 disestablishments in Japan